
Gmina Tarnówka is a rural gmina (administrative district) in Złotów County, Greater Poland Voivodeship, in west-central Poland.

Villages
Gmina Tarnówka contains the villages and settlements of Annopole, Bartoszkowo, Osówka, Piecewo, Plecemin, Płytnica, Pomiarki, Ptusza, Sokolna, Tarnowiec, Tarnowiec-Elektrownia, Tarnówka, Tarnowski Młyn and Węgierce.

Neighbouring gminas
Gmina Tarnówka is bordered by the gminas of Jastrowie, Krajenka, Szydłowo and Złotów.

References
Polish official population figures 2006

Tarnowka
Złotów County